The 2004 Black Reel Awards, which annually recognize and celebrate the achievements of black people in feature, independent and television films, took place in Washington, D.C. on February 22, 2004. Deacons for Defense won the most awards, taking home four awards, with Out of Time and The Fighting Temptations taking home two awards.

Winners and nominees
Winners are listed first and highlighted in bold.

References

2004 in American cinema
Black Reel Awards
2004 film awards
2004 awards in the United States